Tremors is a wooden roller coaster located at Silverwood Theme Park in Athol, Idaho. It features four underground tunnels, the first of which goes under the ride's gift shop.

The initial ride concept was developed by park owner and founder, Gary Norton, after the success of the parks first wooden coaster, Timber Terror. The design was finalized by Custom Coasters International, and the ride was constructed in house by the park.

The ride features a loose earthquake theme, which is visible in the ride's station and gift shop.  This theme was later extended to the Aftershock roller coaster next door when it opened in 2008.  

Tremors held the record for most times underground on a wooden coaster from 1999 to 2006, when the Voyage opened at Holiday World in Santa Claus, Indiana.

In 2010, the ride was the first to receive Topper Track, a new track system designed by Rocky Mountain Construction of Hayden, Idaho. The new system, similar to the company's new Iron Horse I-Box track system is designed to cut down on track maintenance, as well as daily wear and tear. Rocky Mountain Construction's founder, Fred Grubb, had previously assisted with the initial construction of the ride as Silverwood's construction manager.

Starting in 2021, Tremors has also been partially retracted with RMC's new 208 RetraK.

Rankings

References

External links
 http://www.silverwoodthemepark.com/rides/tremors.php - The ride's homepage.

Roller coasters in Idaho
Buildings and structures in Kootenai County, Idaho